Sarpler, Sarplier or (in Scotland) Serplathe was a UK weight for wool.

Definitions  
The Oxford English Dictionary defines a sarpler as 80 tods, where a tod is usually 28lbs thus usually 80 x 28 lbs, or 160 stone, = 

Another definition, half the quantity, is given by Cowell's 1607 book (fourscore=80, 80 stone = 80 x 14lbs = :

A different and apparently arithmetically confused definition is given in The Life and Works of Arthur Hall of Grantham, where he states:

The compendium Sizes Inc offers a range of inconsistent historic definitions, most of which agree that the term had gone out of use, but suggests that:

References

Customary units of measurement
Units of mass